Willst du mit mir gehn ("Do You Want to Go with Me") is a studio album by German pop singer Nena, released in 2005. It's a two-CD set, with the first CD recorded in studio and the second in jam sessions on Majorca. The album reached  in Germany, while the single "Liebe ist" reached  The other singles were title track and "Lass mich".

Background

Artistically Willst du mit mir gehn is arguably the most significant studio album in Nena's career since it ended the dominance of her discography by the 1980s songs which had both made her famous in the first place and then rekindled her career at the start of the new millennium. Although since 2002 Nena had had modest chart success as a featuring artist with Tok Tok, Sam Ragga Band and WestBam, she had not been a contemporary force with new material in her own name. In 2005 Willst du mit mir gehn, and in particular its first two tracks to be released as singles, changed that for the remainder of the decade and beyond.

In 2003, Nena went on vacation to Majorca with her band. There they got together for jam sessions in the evenings, in which Nena sang lyrics she made up in those particular moments. With the only changes made to them being shortenings, select songs are collected on the second CD. The first CD contains the eventual studio album, where three of the recordings from the Majorca sessions were reworked into complete songs.

"Immer weiter" and "Der Anfang" were already performed in Cologne in December 2003. This concert was recorded and released on the live album Nena Live Nena in 2004, before the release of Willst du mit mir gehn.

Concerts from Nena's 2005 Willst du mit mir gehn tour were recorded with a view to being released on DVD but a subsequent dispute between Nena and her management company means that they remain unpublished.

Singles and chart positions

"Liebe ist"

"Liebe ist" was written by Nena and lyrically is a straightforward celebration of a loving relationship which musically alternates between slow, intimate verses and its uptempo, anthemic chorus.

This, being 22 years after "99 Luftballons", set a new record, which still stands, for the longest span between first and last number one in German chart history. After just one week on the top slot, "Liebe ist" was displaced for a week by Sarah Connor's "From Zero to Hero", returned to the  position the following week before once again being knocked off by the Sarah Connor song.

Title track

Throughout her career, Nena's songs have typically been written by various combinations of past and present band members.  The title track to Willst du mit mir gehn was jointly written by Nena and the keyboard player from the former band, Jörn-Uwe Fahrenkrog-Petersen, the same combination that had written a number of the band's most successful 1980s tracks including "? (Fragezeichen)".  Like "Liebe ist" the song has a positive message (about moving forwards and not looking back).  Musically it is very different, being a high-energy, disco track, which immediately installed itself as a permanent feature and highlight of Nena's live concerts.  The promotional video unveiled the look which Nena was to stick to for the next few years longer straighter hair, black and white striped dress and Converse trainers.  During the summer of 2005, the single yo-yo'd in the German charts, peaking at 

A third single "Lass mich" was released from the album in October 2005 but only peaked at  its sales probably undermined by the success of the album which reached  on the German album charts, achieving triple gold status. (See ).

Track listing

Charts

Weekly charts

Year-end charts

Certifications and sales

References

External links
 Willst du mit mir gehn at the official Nena website
 

2005 albums
Nena albums
German-language albums
Warner Music Group albums